The Cambodia Project (CPI) is a nonprofit organization whose mission is to develop secondary education opportunities for underserved children in rural Cambodia.  The Cambodia Project, Inc. is a 501(c)(3) nonprofit organization recognized under the Internal Revenue Code of the United States, Public Charity Status 170(b)(1)(A)(vi).

The Cambodia Project was founded in 2006 by Jean-Michel Tijerina, after a trip to Cambodia during which he discovered a need for improved access to basic country infrastructure and education.  The organization is managed by staff located in both New York and Cambodia.  Development professionals and students from international graduate schools provide technical advice in key areas, such as education planning and economic development.  The schools include Columbia University, Institut d'Études Politiques de Paris (Sciences Po), University of Texas at Austin, and Stanford University.  The organization's main priorities are:

    * To rebuild the secondary school education system after the loss of many educators during the genocide under the Khmer Rouge.
    * To build new schools in rural areas of Cambodia not served by other schools.
    * To provide children access to secondary education regardless of their gender, ethnicity, religion, or disabilities.

The Cambodia Project Mission:

The Cambodia Project's mission is to provide inclusive education to all children from grades 7 to 12, encouraging them to think critically and providing them with vocational skills. Today, only 31% of children and 28% of girls are enrolled in secondary school.

The Cambodia Project will work with three separate communities south of the capital, Phnom Penh: the first in Kep municipality, the second and third in Takéo and Kandal provinces. The government of Cambodia and the World Food Program recognize the populations in these areas as some of the country’s most vulnerable to the cycle of poverty due to low income, lack of access to education, and basic healthcare. The first school is strategically located on the border of Kep and Kampot in order to allow tuition paid by working-class families in Kampot to subsidize tuition for the most needy in Kep.

The Cambodia Project has been working with local government officials and communities to provide replicable school models, educational resources, and trained teachers in both the public and private education systems.  The CPI model is designed so that each school would become financially self-reliant and locally managed by the end of four years.

Education Objectives

CPI will employ educators from a pool of qualified public school teachers in the region and recruit graduates from the local teacher training colleges, providing employment opportunities in an otherwise narrow job market. One-third of teachers will be hired part-time from neighboring public schools to supplement their government income. School management committees and community task forces will support teacher monitoring and evaluation.

Comprehensive Healthcare

A major barrier for children completing secondary education is illness that takes them out of the classroom. CPI plans to address this issue through an onsite health clinic that offers preventative and routine care for simple health needs and referrals for more complex health conditions.

Environmental Sustainability

The Cambodia Project schools are designed to be environmentally sustainable, based on LEED standards, by deploying energy-efficient technologies, efficient utilization of resources and promoting environmental education. The design will potentially give students experience regarding the operation and maintenance of green technology as part of their vocational training.

Economic Sustainability

To finance school operation costs, CPI has developed a sustainable funding model, which is a combination of diverse revenue generating streams.  For example, microfinance will be used to provide loans for tuition, entrepreneurial graduates and students’ families.  The aim is to facilitate economic development in the school areas.  Revenues from this program will be utilized for scholarships to subsidize the lowest income students’ tuition.  Other anticipated revenue streams will come from an agriculture program, crafts, ecotourism, and strategic partnerships with NGOs to provide conditional cash grants to families to ensure student attendance, tuition subsidies, and equitable teacher salaries and incentives.

Implementation and Fundraising

Corporate support for The Cambodia Project currently comes from Google, the Shelley and Donald Rubin Foundation, the Susan Hartwig Family Fund, Michiels Architecture & Partners, Weil, Gotshal & Manges LLP, and Raffles Hotels.

Summer 2008 Field Mission:

The summer 2008 in-country field team selected the land site for construction, recruited local contractors and architects, initiated engineering plans for construction, met with students and families for needs assessments and local NGOs and businesses in exploring revenue generation options for sustainability, researched Khmer curriculum for secondary education and teacher professional training, met with pertinent government officials as well as local and international NGOs for research and partnership exploration in regard to education and economic development, and presented a medical needs assessment for the school community.

Summer 2009 Field Mission:

On June 1, 2009 twenty of the organization's 84 members will be traveling to Cambodia.  The team will spend the summer recruiting and training teachers for the school, in collaboration with the Takéo Teacher Training College. To develop a health clinic for the students and their families, part of the team will be working with local hospitals and clinics in Takéo, and Kep.

A documentary filmmaker will accompany the team.  He will film the progress of the field team and also follow the organization over several years.  He plans to produce a film about the Cambodia Project.

References

External links
The Cambodia Project's web page
The Cambodia Project FAQ
The Cambodia Project Team

Educational organisations based in Cambodia